The Batman Cup is a professional tennis tournament played on hard courts. From 2015, it is part of the ATP Challenger Tour. The tournament is currently held in Batman, Turkey.

Past finals

Singles

Doubles

References

ATP Challenger Tour
Hard court tennis tournaments
Tennis tournaments in Turkey